Scott Milne Matheson Jr. (January 8, 1929 – October 7, 1990) was an American politician who served as the 12th Governor of Utah from 1977 to 1985. He is the most recent Democrat to serve in that position.

Biography 
Matheson was born on January 8, 1929, in Chicago to Latter-day Saint parents Scott Milne and Adele Adams Matheson. His paternal grandparents were Scottish immigrants and his maternal grandfather was born to parents from Northern Ireland and England. Soon after his birth, the family moved to Utah, settling first in Parowan, before moving to Salt Lake City, when his father became a federal prosecutor.

Matheson graduated from Salt Lake City's East High School in 1946, earned a bachelor's degree in political science from the University of Utah in 1950, and a law degree from Stanford University Law School in 1952. He operated a private law practice in Iron County, Utah, for five years before taking a position with Union Pacific Railroad in 1958. During his service with the railroad he rose to the position of general counsel before making his 1976 run for governor.

During his term as governor, Matheson was named the defendant in the U.S. Supreme Court case of H. L. v. Matheson, which upheld state law requiring parental consent for a teenage girl to obtain an abortion.

On August 25, 1951, he married Norma Louise Warenski, and the couple had four children. One is former U.S. Congressman Jim Matheson. Another son, Scott Matheson Jr., was the Democratic nominee for Governor of Utah in the 2004 election, and was appointed as a federal judge in 2010.

In 1989, Matheson was diagnosed with multiple myeloma, a rare form of cancer believed to have been caused by radioactive fallout from nuclear testing in Nevada. Scott Matheson died from the disease on October 7, 1990, at the age of 61. He was buried in Parowan City Cemetery in Parowan, Utah.

References

External links

|-

|-

|-

1929 births
1990 deaths
20th-century American politicians
Latter Day Saints from Utah
Deaths from cancer in Utah
Deaths from multiple myeloma
Democratic Party governors of Utah
People from Parowan, Utah
Politicians from Chicago
Politicians from Salt Lake City
Lawyers from Salt Lake City
Stanford Law School alumni
Union Pacific Railroad people
University of Utah alumni
20th-century American lawyers